Scambopus is a monotypic genus of flowering plants belonging to the family Brassicaceae. The only species is Scambopus curvipes.

Its native range is Southern Australia.

References

Brassicaceae
Monotypic Brassicaceae genera